Tawas Point Light is located in the Tawas Point State Park off Tawas Bay in Lake Huron in Baldwin Township in Northern Michigan.

History
In 1850, Congress appropriated $5,000 for the construction of a lighthouse. In 1852, construction started, and the lighthouse was commissioned in 1853. After the lighthouse was built, many problems were encountered. Shifting sands caused the point to be extended by nearly a mile. The original light was a 5th Order Fresnel lens, later upgraded when the building was replaced.

In 1867, the Inspector of the lighthouse said that the lighthouse was wearing down to the point where they should consider renovating it. The Lighthouse Board ignored his request to put more money in the lighthouse because they had bigger problems at hand in Ottawa Point. The waves caused sand build-up by the Point, which added almost a mile, more of land. The lighthouse was so far inland that mariners were unable to see the lighthouse's light. To add to the problem this lighthouse was known for its dim light. With all these problems combined, it caused a shipwreck from Captain Olmstead's schooner "Dolphin". He blamed the lighthouse stating that it was too dim to see the light. This caused the Lighthouse board to reconsider their option at renovating or rebuilding a new one. In 1875 Congress approved a $30,000 amount for a brand new lighthouse. They finished building the lighthouse sometime in 1877.

It was originally known as Ottawa Point. The name was officially changed to Tawas Point in 1902. The point is a substantial hazard to navigation. Additionally, because it is tucked behind the point, Tawas Bay is an ideal shelter from storms, wind and waves out of the north and northeast. The point juts out into Lake Huron, and has been getting much larger over time. A map is available, which shows the accretion. The original light was begun in 1852, and completed in 1853. The light was fueled at various times by lard oil, then kerosene, and the current light is of course now electric. This is the second lighthouse on the point.

The tower has in place a Fourth Order Fresnel lens.

It is currently being remodeled by the Michigan Department of Natural Resources, with the assistance and contributions of the Friends of Tawas Point State Park. The downstairs eventually will become a museum for the lighthouse and the upstairs becoming a mini-cabin available for rent by the public. The house is itself available for one and two week stays (for a fee, and with an agreement to act as a trained volunteer). Volunteer keepers will stay for up to two weeks.

Because of its popularity, picturesque form and location, it is often the subject of photographs, and even of needlepoint illustrations.

The Tawas lifesaving station has recently been saved and renovation continues.

The Fresnel lens is still operative, being one of Only 70 such lenses that remain operational in the United States, sixteen of which are use on the Great Lakes of which eight are in Michigan.

In October 2015, the Coast Guard announced that it would remove the Fresnel lens and replace it with a modern optic beacon. But after public comments, the lens remains in place.

Current events
An enlarged replica called the "Tri-Centennial Light of Detroit" is modeled after the Tawas Point Light, was built at Tri-Centennial State Park. The lighthouse is 63 feet tall, and marks the harbor entrance. "The new safety light tower is believed to be the first conical brick structure of this type built in Michigan since 1892 and serves as a tribute to Michigan's Great Lakes maritime history."
New information from the Michigan Department of Natural Resources has confirmed the private sale of the Tawas Point Light in early March, 2013. Sold for an undisclosed amount, renovations by the state of Michigan will continue to proceed.

See also
Lighthouses in the United States

References

Further reading

 A Child's View of the Tawas Point Light, Michigan Time Traveler: Lansing State Journal and Michigan Historical Center.
 Crompton, Samuel Willard & Michael J. Rhein, The Ultimate Book of Lighthouses (2002) ; .
 Hyde, Charles K., and Ann and John Mahan. The Northern Lights: Lighthouses of the Upper Great Lakes. Detroit: Wayne State University Press, 1995.  .
 Jones, Ray & Bruce Roberts, American Lighthouses (Globe Pequot, September 1, 1998, 1st Ed.) ; .
 Jones, Ray,The Lighthouse Encyclopedia, The Definitive Reference (Globe Pequot, January 1, 2004, 1st ed.) ; .
 Lighthouse Central, Tawas Point Light Photographs, History and Directions, The Ultimate Guide to East Michigan Lighthouses by Jerry Roach (Publisher: Bugs Publishing LLC - July 2006). ; .
 Noble, Dennis, Lighthouses & Keepers: U. S. Lighthouse Service and Its Legacy (Annapolis: U. S. Naval Institute Press, 1997). ; .
 Oleszewski, Wes, Great Lakes Lighthouses, American and Canadian: A Comprehensive Directory/Guide to Great Lakes Lighthouses, (Gwinn, Michigan: Avery Color Studios, Inc., 1998) .
 Penrod, John, Lighthouses of Michigan, (Berrien Center, Michigan: Penrod/Hiawatha, 1998)  .
 Penrose, Laurie and Bill, A Traveler’s Guide to 116 Michigan Lighthouses (Petoskey, Michigan: Friede Publications, 1999).  .
 
 United States Coast Guard, Aids to Navigation, (Washington, DC: U. S. Government Printing Office, 1945).
 
 
 
 Wagner, John L., Michigan Lighthouses: An Aerial Photographic Perspective, (East Lansing, Michigan: John L. Wagner, 1998)  .
 Wright, Larry and Wright, Patricia, Great Lakes Lighthouses Encyclopedia Hardback (Erin: Boston Mills Press, 2006) .

External links 
 Tawas Point Lighthouse - official site
 Aerial photos, Tawas Point Light, marinas.com.
 National Park Service Maritime Heritage Program, Inventory of Historic Lights, Tawas Point Light.
 U.S. Lighthouses on Tawas Point light
 U.S. Coast Guard Search & Rescue Index

Lighthouses completed in 1853
Lighthouses completed in 1876
Lighthouses on the National Register of Historic Places in Michigan
Museums in Iosco County, Michigan
Lighthouse museums in Michigan
Michigan State Historic Sites
National Register of Historic Places in Iosco County, Michigan